The New Territories is one of the three main regions of Hong Kong, alongside Hong Kong Island and the Kowloon Peninsula. It makes up 86.2% of Hong Kong's territory, and contains around half of the population of Hong Kong. Historically, it is the region described in the Convention for the Extension of Hong Kong Territory.  According to that treaty, the territories comprise the mainland area north of Boundary Street on the Kowloon Peninsula and south of the Sham Chun River (which is the border between Hong Kong and Mainland China), as well as over 200 outlying islands, including Lantau Island, Lamma Island, Cheung Chau, and Peng Chau in the territory of HK.

Later, after New Kowloon was defined from the area between the Boundary Street and the Kowloon Ranges spanned from Lai Chi Kok to Lei Yue Mun, and the extension of the urban areas of Kowloon, New Kowloon was gradually urbanised and absorbed into Kowloon.

The New Territories now comprises only the mainland north of the Kowloon Ranges and south of the Sham Chun River, as well as the Outlying Islands. It comprises an area of 952 km2 (368 sq mi). Nevertheless, New Kowloon has remained statutorily part of the New Territories instead of Kowloon.

The New Territories were leased from Qing China by the United Kingdom in 1898 for 99 years in the Second Convention of Peking (The Convention for the Extension of Hong Kong Territory). Upon the expiry of the lease, sovereignty was transferred to the People's Republic of China in 1997, together with the Qing-ceded territories of Hong Kong Island and Kowloon Peninsula.

In 2011, the population of the New Territories was recorded at 3,691,093. with a population density of 3,801 per square kilometer (9,845 per square mile).

History

Lease of New Territories

Hong Kong Island was ceded to Britain in 1842 and Kowloon south of Boundary Street and Stonecutters Island in 1860. The colony of Hong Kong attracted a large number of Chinese and Westerners to seek their fortune in the city. Its population increased rapidly and the city became overcrowded. The outbreak of bubonic plague in 1894 became a concern to the Hong Kong Government. There was a need to expand the colony to accommodate its growing population. The Qing Dynasty's defeat in the First Sino-Japanese War had shown that it was incapable of defending itself. Victoria City and Victoria Harbour were vulnerable to any hostile forces launching attacks from the hills of Kowloon.

Alarmed by the encroachment of other European powers in China, Britain also feared for the security of Hong Kong. Using the most favoured nation clause that it had negotiated with Peking, the United Kingdom demanded the extension of Kowloon to counter the influence of France in southern China in June 1898. In July, it secured Weihaiwei in Shandong in the north as a base for operations against the Germans in Qingdao (Tsingtao) and the Russians in Port Arthur. Chinese officials stayed in the walled cities of Kowloon City and Weihaiwei.

The extension of Kowloon was called the New Territories. The additional land was estimated to be 365 square miles (945 km2) or 12 times the size of the existing Colonial Hong Kong at the time.

British assumption of sovereignty

Although the Convention was signed on the 9 June 1898 and became effective on 1 July, the British did not take over the New Territories immediately. During this period, there was no Hong Kong Governor and Wilsone Black acted as administrator. James Stewart Lockhart, the Colonial Secretary of Hong Kong, was sent back from England to make a survey of New Territories before formal transfer. The survey found that the new frontier at Sham Chun River (Shenzhen river) suggested by Wilsone Black was far from ideal. It excluded the town of Shenzhen (Sham Chun), and the boundary would divide the town. There was no mountain range as a natural border. Lockhart suggested moving the frontier to the line of hills north of Shenzhen. This suggestion was not received favourably and the Chinese official suggested the frontier be moved to the hill much further south of the Sham Chun River. It was settled in March 1899 that the boundary remain at the Sham Chun River.

The new Hong Kong Governor Henry Blake arrived in November 1898. The date for the takeover of the New Territories was fixed as 17 April 1899 and Tai Po was chosen as the administrative centre. However the transfer was not smooth and peaceful. Before the handover in early April, Captain Superintendent of Police, Francis Henry May and some policemen erected a flagstaff and temporary headquarters at Tai Po and posted the Governor's proclamation of the takeover date. Fearing for their traditional land rights, in the Six-Day War of 1899, a number of clans attempted to resist the British, mobilising clan militias that had been organised and armed to protect against longshore raids by pirates. The militia men attempted a frontal attack against the temporary police station in Tai Po that was the main British base but were beaten back by superior force of arms. An attempt by the clansmen at guerilla warfare was put down by the British near Lam Tsuen with over 500 Chinese men killed, and collapsed when British artillery was brought to bear on the walled villages of the clansmen. Most prominent of the villages in the resistance Kat Hing Wai, of the Tang clan, was symbolically disarmed, by having its main gates dismounted and removed. However, in order to prevent future resistance the British made concessions to the indigenous inhabitants with regards to land use, land inheritance and marriage laws; the majority of which remained in place into the 1960s when polygamy was outlawed. Some of the concessions with regard to land use and inheritance remain in place in Hong Kong to this day and is a source of friction between indigenous inhabitants and other Hong Kong residents.

Lord Lugard was Governor from 1907 to 1912, and he proposed the return of Weihaiwei to the Chinese government, in return for the ceding of the leased New Territories in perpetuity. The proposal was not received favourably, although if it had been acted on, Hong Kong might have remained forever in British hands.

New town development

Much of the New Territories was, and to a limited extent still is, made up of rural areas. Attempts at modernising the area did not become fully committed until the late 1970s, when many new towns were built to accommodate the population growth from urbanised areas of Kowloon and Hong Kong Island. Despite rapid development of the new towns, which now accommodate a population of over 3 million, the Hong Kong Government confines built-up areas to a few areas and reserves large parts of the region as parkland.

Sovereignty transfer to the PRC
As the expiry date of the lease neared in the 1980s, talks between the United Kingdom and the People's Republic of China led to the signing of the Sino-British Joint Declaration (1984), in which the whole of Hong Kong would be returned, instead of only the New Territories.

Districts
The New Territories comprises nine districts each with their own District Council:

 New Territories East
 North District
 Sai Kung
 Sha Tin
 Tai Po
 New Territories West
 Islands
 Kwai Tsing (Kwai Chung and Tsing Yi Island)
 Tsuen Wan
 Tuen Mun
 Yuen Long

Population 
According to the 2011 census, the population of the New Territories was 3,691,093, representing 52.2% of Hong Kong's total population. 88.4% of the residents of New Territories use Cantonese as their main language. 4.3% of its residents use English, 1.2% use Mandarin Chinese, and 3.3% of New Territories' residents use other Chinese dialects. 95.1% of the district's population is of Chinese descent. The largest ethnic minority groups are Filipinos (31.5%), Indonesians (26.2%), South Asians (14.5%), Mixed (11.2%) and Whites (10.0%).

New Kowloon 
New Kowloon covers the entirety of the Wong Tai Sin and Kwun Tong districts, as well as the mainland portion of the Sham Shui Po District (i.e. excluding the Stonecutters Island) and the northern portion of the Kowloon City District (portion to the north of Boundary Street/Prince Edward Road West, as well as reclaimed land including the Kai Tak Airport).

See also

 Boundary Street
 Country parks and conservation in Hong Kong
 Kowloon Peninsula
 List of areas of Hong Kong
 New Kowloon

References

Further reading 
Hill, R. D., Kathy Ng, and Tse Pui Wan. "The Suburbanization of Rural Villages in the New Territories, Hong Kong." (Working Paper No. 38) (Archive) University of Hong Kong Centre of Urban Studies & Urban Planning (CUSUP, 城市研究及城市規劃中心). April 1989.

External links 

 Lease of the New Territories
 Lease of the New Territories
 Cap 1 Sched 5A - Area of the New Territories

 
1898 establishments in Hong Kong
States and territories established in 1898
Territorial disputes of the Republic of China
Peninsulas of China